Lucas de Souza Bitencourt (born 12 March 1994) is a Brazilian male artistic gymnast and part of the national team. He participated at the 2015 World Artistic Gymnastics Championships in Glasgow.

References

1994 births
Living people
Brazilian male artistic gymnasts
Place of birth missing (living people)
Gymnasts at the 2015 Pan American Games
Pan American Games silver medalists for Brazil
Pan American Games medalists in gymnastics
South American Games silver medalists for Brazil
South American Games medalists in gymnastics
Competitors at the 2014 South American Games
Competitors at the 2022 South American Games
Medalists at the 2015 Pan American Games
21st-century Brazilian people